is a Japanese video game music composer and sound director. He is credited for over twenty musical scores produced for Capcom's video game releases including the Monster Hunter and Devil May Cry series, as well those in the Darkstalkers, Power Stone and Resident Evil Outbreak series. His later works with the company involved organizing orchestral recordings for Resident Evil 5 and Monster Hunter Tri. In 2009, Shibata left Capcom and began his own music studio, known as Unique Note, with colleague Yoshino Aoki.

Biography

Early life
Tetsuya Shibata was born October 24, 1973 in Osaka, Japan. While growing up, his mother was a singer and a music teacher. Shibata began playing classical piano at a very young age. He taught himself how to play guitar, bass guitar, and drums while in junior high school and high school. Shibata completed a law degree from Kansai University in 1996. While at the university, he heavily studied classic, rock, and jazz genres outside of his major. He eventually bought a synthesizer to compose his own music.

Career
With a high interest in starting a career in the musical field, Shibata began applying for jobs in composition after college. Friends of some of his relatives introduced him to the video game industry. Shibata joined Capcom's Sound Management Section in 1997, where he took on various roles such as manager, director, producer, and composer for over twenty different games in a twelve-year span. His earliest works were many fighting games such as the Darkstalkers and Power Stone series. Among other titles, Shibata, alongside Mitsuhiko Takano and frequent collaborator Masato Kouda, created the score for the first game in Capcom's successful Monster Hunter series. Notably, Shibata composed music for the second, third, and fourth installments in Capcom's highly regarded Devil May Cry series. In later releases he chose to replace electronic music with vocal songs in the games' various battle and ending themes to make the music more recognizable for each game. One of these pieces, "Out of Darkness" from Devil May Cry 4, was nominated for a Game Audio Network Guild (G.A.N.G.) Award in 2009. He proclaimed that his favorite project so far has been Devil May Cry 3: Dante's Awakening, on which he did all the sound production. He also personally found this to be the most challenging project in his career. Shibata's role in the soundtrack production of 2006's Dead Rising involved bringing in licensed music alongside Capcom's in-house compositions.

In late 2008 and early 2009, Shibata worked as senior sound director on two major releases. For Resident Evil 5, he organized recordings by the Hollywood Studio Symphony, and did the same for Monster Hunter Tri with the FILMharmonic Orchestra in Prague. In addition, he produced the Monster Hunter Orchestra Concert, a concert celebrating the fifth anniversary of the Monster Hunter franchise. Some of his compositions from the original Monster Hunter were performed. This would be his last role at Capcom, as he states that he left the company because he wanted to create music for a wide range of companies and genres, including those outside of video games. Torn between his responsibilities as a manager and his desire to compose music more freely, he was reluctant to leave the game developer because he had many ongoing projects at the time. His superior informed him that Capcom would not argue with his decision.

In May 2009, he founded and became the president of his own music company known as Unique Note. The company aspires to create music for several types of media like television, commercials, films, and film trailers, as well as video games. Shibata himself plays guitar, bass guitar, and keyboard for his own compositions. Early in the company's establishment, Shibata was joined by another former Capcom composer, Yoshino Aoki, who is now the group's vice president as well as a composer, arranger, and lyricist. Shibata had previously worked with Aoki on several projects at Capcom. He had gained respect for her musical talent over the years, especially for her score of Breath of Fire IV which he experienced while he was putting together the Breath of Fire Original Soundtrack Special Box in 2006. So far Unique Note has worked on musical scores for Fullmetal Alchemist: Senka wo Takuseshi Mono and Half-Minute Hero for the PlayStation Portable, as well as two musicals.

Musical style and influences
Shibata lists musical influences from many different genres before joining Capcom. As a child, he was exposed to the classical styles of Frédéric Chopin and Franz Schubert. In middle school he listened to Britpop bands Kajagoogoo and Boy George. In high school, he became interested in rock bands such as Aerosmith, Guns N' Roses, and Led Zeppelin. By college, he began listening to the jazz stylings of Oscar Peterson, Makoto Ozone, Chick Corea, and Baptiste Trotignon.

Works

Composer/arranger
Vampire Hunter 2: Darkstalkers' Revenge (1997) – with Takayuki Iwai
Vampire Savior 2: The Lord of Vampire (1997) – with Takayuki Iwai
Street Fighter Alpha 3 (1998) – with Takayuki Iwai, Yuki Iwai, Isao Abe and Hideki Okugawa
Plasma Sword: Nightmare of Bilstein (1998) – with Takayuki Iwai
Power Stone (1999)
Marvel vs. Capcom 2: New Age of Heroes (2000) – with Mitsuhiko Takano
Vampire Chronicle for Matching Service (2000) – with Yuko Takehara
Power Stone 2 (2000)
Heavy Metal: Geomatrix (2001)
Auto Modellista (2002) – with Isao Abe
Devil May Cry 2 (2003) – with Masato Koda and Satoshi Ise
Resident Evil Outbreak (2004) – with Mitsuhiko Takano, Kento Hasegawa and Etsuko Yoneda
Monster Hunter (2004) – with Masato Koda and Mitsuhiko Takano
Resident Evil Outbreak File #2 (2005) – with Mitsuhiko Takano, Kento Hasegawa and Etsuko Yoneda
Devil May Cry 3 (2005) – with Kento Hasegawa
Street Fighter Alpha 3 Max (2006) – with Takayuki Iwai
Devil May Cry 4 (2008) – with various others
Fullmetal Alchemist: Senka wo Takuseshi Mono (2009) – with Yoshino Aoki
Half-Minute Hero (2009) – with various others
Otomedius Excellent (2011) – with various others
Earth Seeker (2011) – with Yoshino Aoki
Half-Minute Hero: The Second Coming (2011) – with various others
Merc Storia (2014) – with Yoshino Aoki and Kenichi Tendo
Super Smash Bros. for Nintendo 3DS and Wii U (2014) – arrangements with many others
Transformers: Devastation (2015) – with Satoshi Igarashi, Jun Okubo, Vince DiCola, and Kenny Meredith
Uppers (2016) – with Yoshino Aoki, Yuko Komiyama, and Jun Okubo
Justice Monsters Five (2016) – with Unique Note
Final Fantasy XV (2016) – with Yoko Shimomura, Yoshino Aoki, and Yoshitaka Suzuki
Super Smash Bros. Ultimate (2018) - Arrangements of "Lost Painting", "Prelude (Ablaze)" and "Wrecking Crew Medley".
Gungrave G.O.R.E (2022) - With Yoshino Aoki
Sound director/producerMonster Hunter Freedom 2 (2007)Monster Hunter Freedom Unite (2008)Resident Evil 5 (2009)Monster Hunter Tri (2009)

Other worksBreath of Fire Original Soundtrack Special Box (2006)Monster Hunter Orchestra Concert ~Hunting Music Festival~ (2009)Rakuen (2009) – with Yoshino AokiSuisei'' (2009) - with Yoshino Aoki

References

External links
Unique Note official website 

Composer profile at OverClocked ReMix

1973 births
Capcom people
Japanese composers
Japanese male composers
Living people
Kansai University alumni
Musicians from Osaka Prefecture
Video game composers